Kenya Julia Niambi Sarah Jones (born February 9, 1993), known professionally as Kenya Kinski-Jones, is an American fashion model.

Early life and education 
Jones was born in Los Angeles, California to American musician Quincy Jones and German actress Nastassja Kinski (née Nakszynski). She has two maternal half-siblings and 6 paternal half-siblings including actresses Rashida and Kidada Jones, and producer Quincy Jones III. Jones has been a vegetarian since she was 8 years old.

In 2015, Jones graduated from Loyola Marymount University with a degree in journalism.

Career 
Jones was discovered by fashion photographer Bruce Weber, who shot her first modeling job in Vogue España. She started her career at Ford Models. Her first runway show was for Chanel. She has done campaigns for Calvin Klein, Stella McCartney, Nasty Gal, and Ermanno Scervino. Jones has appeared in editorials for Vogue, Harper's Bazaar, Nylon, Teen Vogue, V, Glamour, and L'Officiel.

Personal life 
Jones has been in a relationship with American actor Will Peltz, a son of the businessman Nelson Peltz, since 2011.

References 

Living people
1993 births
African-American female models
American people of German descent
American people of Polish descent
American people of Cameroonian descent
American people of Tikar descent
American people of Welsh descent
Loyola Marymount University alumni
People from Los Angeles
Female models from California
American female models
Family of Quincy Jones
Ford Models models
Tikar people
21st-century African-American people
21st-century African-American women